The San Juan River is an important river of Colombia that flows into the Pacific Ocean through the Chocó Department. The average discharge of the Rio San Juan is 2,054.67 m³/s.

Geography
The river begins on Cerro Caramanta in the West Andes.  The delta is due north of Bahía Málaga and Buenaventura.

The mouth of the river has extensive stands of mangroves, part of the Esmeraldas-Pacific Colombia mangroves ecoregion.

Hydrometry
Monthly average flow of San Juan River ( m³/second) measured at Penitas stationData from 25 years

Fauna

Reptiles 
A species of snake, Dipsas sanctijoannis, is named after the San Juan River of Colombia, and is native to the watershed.

Fish 
Andinoacara biseriatus - A Cichlid.

See also
List of rivers of Colombia
Pacific Region, Colombia

References

External links
 San Juan River delta on coastal.er.usgs.gov

Rivers of Colombia